Fugaku  is a petascale supercomputer at the Riken Center for Computational Science in Kobe, Japan. It started development in 2014 as the successor to the K computer and made its debut in 2020. It is named after an alternative name for Mount Fuji. 

It became the fastest supercomputer in the world in the June 2020 TOP500 list as well as becoming the first ARM architecture-based computer to achieve this. At this time it also achieved 1.42 exaFLOPS using the mixed fp16/fp64 precision HPL-AI benchmark. It started regular operations in 2021. 

Fugaku was superseded as the fastest supercomputer in the world by Frontier in May 2022.

Hardware 
The supercomputer is built with the Fujitsu A64FX microprocessor. This CPU is based on the ARM version 8.2A processor architecture, and adopts the Scalable Vector Extensions for supercomputers. Fugaku was aimed to be about 100 times more powerful than the K computer (i.e. a performance target of 1 exaFLOPS).

The initial (June 2020) configuration of Fugaku used 158,976 A64FX CPUs joined using Fujitsu's proprietary torus fusion interconnect. An upgrade in November 2020 increased the number of processors.

Software 
Fugaku will use a "light-weight multi-kernel operating system" named IHK/McKernel. The operating system uses both Linux and the McKernel light-weight kernel operating simultaneously and side by side. The infrastructure that both kernels run on is termed the Interface for Heterogeneous Kernels (IHK). The high-performance simulations are run on McKernel, with Linux available for all other POSIX-compatible services.

Besides the system software, the supercomputer has run many kinds of applications, including several benchmarks. Running the mainstream HPL benchmark, used by TOP500, Fugaku is at petascale and almost halfway to exascale. Additionally, Fugaku has set world records on at least three other benchmarks, including HPL-AI; at 2.0 exaflops, the system has exceeded the exascale threshold for the benchmark. A description of that benchmark is as follows:

Performance 
The reported initial performance of Fugaku was a Rmax of 416 petaFLOPS in the FP64 high performance LINPACK benchmark used by the TOP500. After the November 2020 upgrade in the number of processors, Fugaku's performance increased to a Rmax of 442 petaFLOPS.

In 2020, Fugaku also attained top spots in other rankings that test computers on different workloads, including Graph500, HPL-AI, and HPCG benchmark. No previous supercomputer has ever led all four rankings at once.

After a hardware upgrade, as of November 2020, "Fugaku increased its performance on the new mixed precision HPC-AI benchmark to 2.0 exaflops, besting its 1.4 exaflops mark recorded six months ago. These represent the first benchmark measurements above one exaflop for any precision on any type of hardware." (a 42% increase) Interestingly, the Arm A64FX core-count was only increased by 4.5%, to 7,630,848, but the measured performance rose much more on that benchmark (and the system does not use other compute capabilities, such as GPUs), and a little more on TOP500, or by 6.4%, to 442 petaflops, a new world record and widening the gap to the next computer by that much. For the HPCG benchmark, it is 5.4 times faster, at 16.0 HPCG-petaflops, than the number two system, Summit, which happens to also be second on TOP500.

Fugaku's performance surpasses the combined performance of the next 4 supercomputers on the TOP500 list (almost next 5) and surpasses by a 45% margin all the other top-10 computers on the HPCG benchmark.

Note that it has been reported since at least before May 2021 that China had developed a supercomputer with its own technology that exceeds the performance of Fugaku by a factor of two or more, and was secretly operating it to avoid sanctions by the United States. In fact, a paper using this machine won the Gordon Bell Prize for best paper. As of May 2022, China is reportedly operating two supercomputers with exascale  performance.

History 
On May 23, 2019, Riken announced that the supercomputer was to be named Fugaku. In August 2019, the logo for Fugaku was unveiled; it depicts Mount Fuji, symbolising "Fugaku's high performance" and "the wide range of its users". In November 2019, the prototype of Fugaku won first place in the Green500 list. Shipment of the equipment racks to the Riken facility began on December 2, 2019, and was completed on May 13, 2020. In June 2020, Fugaku became the fastest supercomputer in the world in the TOP500 list, displacing the IBM Summit.

Fugaku has been used for research on masks related to the COVID-19 pandemic.

Cost 
In 2018, Nikkei reported the programme would cost  (c. US$ billion).

Comparison

See also 
 ARM supercomputers
 Aurora (supercomputer)
 Frontier (supercomputer)
 List of fastest computers
 Summit (supercomputer)
 TOP500

References

External links 
  
 Satoshi Matsuoka - Supercomputing for Everyone, SIAG_SC(28th June 2022) (Lecture  about Fugaku for general audience)

2020 in science
Exascale computers
Fujitsu supercomputers
Petascale computers
Riken
64-bit computers